Clarence Park railway station is located on the Seaford and Flinders lines. Situated in the inner south-western Adelaide suburb of Clarence Park, it is 6.3 kilometres from Adelaide station.

History 

The station was opened in 1913 following a request from local Unley Council ratepayers.

The ticket office was closed in 1921, but reopened shortly after with Mrs. M. Murphy appointed agent for the sale of tickets. Significant improvements were undertaken in 1935 to add a new waiting room and ticket office.

Services by platform

References

External links

Flickr gallery

Railway stations in Adelaide
Railway stations in Australia opened in 1913